This is a list of professional wrestlers, referees and other personnel who currently and formerly worked in the Japanese professional wrestling promotion Active Advance Pro Wrestling.

Personnel

Current wrestlers

Corporate staff

Alumni/notable guests

Male wrestlers

Carolina Akiko (Ring Announcer/Presenter)
Daigoro Kashiwa
Daiki Shimomura
DJ Nira/BAKA Michinoku
Drew Parker
Hayato Tamura
HUB
Hi69
Hiro Tonai
Hajime Ishikawa
Kim Nam-Seok
Kota Sekifuda
Madoka/Super-X
Makoto Oishi
Mikata Fuyuki (Ring Announcer)
Mike Lee Jr.
Minoru Fujita
Nobutaka Moribe
Ofune
Owen Phoenix
PABLO
Marines Mask II
Randy Takuya
Ryota Chikuzen
Ryota Nakatsu
Ryuichi Sekine
'Sheik' Behnam Ali
Saburo Inematsu
Shota
Takashi Sasaki
Taku Anzawa
Tank Nagai
Teppei Ishizaka
Tomomitsu Matsunaga
Yasu Urano
Silver Wolf
Yoshiaki Yago
YOSHIYA
Yuji Hino
Yusaku Obata

Joshi talent

Alex Lee
Apple Miyuki
Bambi
Mika Iwata
Miku Aono
Tae Honma
Tomoka Nakagawa
Totoro Satsuki
Tsukushi
Yuki Mashiro
Yuu Yamagata

See also

List of professional wrestlers
Professional wrestling in Japan

References

External links
2AW Official Site (Japanese)
K-DOJO Official Site (Japanese)
 K-DOJO Fan Site (English)

Active Advance Pro Wrestling
Lists of professional wrestling personnel